Henry IV of Asberg (19 March 1409, Dornhausen - 26 July 1492) was a nobleman of the Franconian House of Absberg and clergyman. From 1465 to his death he was bishop of Regensburg.

According to   Biedermann (1748), he was the son of Henry of Absberg, Rumberg, Reicheneck and Dornhausen and of Magdalena Seiboldsdorf.
He was elected bishop in 1457, but the election was annulled, and  Rupert of Palatinate-Mosbach became bishop in his stead.
Ruprecht died in 1465, at the age of 32, and Henry became his successor.

As bishop, Henry campaigned against the apocalyptic  heresies of the Wirsberg brothers in 1466.

The city of Regensburg fell under the control of the Duke of Bavaria in 1486, and the powers of the prince-bishop were curtailed. 
Regensburg passed back to the prince-bishop in 1492, following an intervention of Frederick III.

After his death, Henry was succeeded by his coadjutor, Rupert of Palatinate-Simmern.
His tomb is located in the side-aisle of Regensburg cathedral.

References

 Johann Gottfried Biedermann: Geschlechtsregister Der Reichsfrey unmittelbaren Ritterschaft Landes zu Franken Löblichen Orts an der Altmühl.... Bayreuth 1748. Tafel CLXVIII.
 Josef Staber: Kirchengeschichte des Bistums Regensburg. Regensburg 1966, 88–94.

1409 births
1492 deaths
Roman Catholic bishops of Regensburg
House of Absberg
15th-century Roman Catholic bishops in Bavaria